Genie is the second extended play by South Korean girl group Girls' Generation. The EP was released on June 29, 2009, by SM Entertainment. Composers Yoo Young-jin, Kenzie, Hwang Seong-je and Kim Jin-hwan joined the production of the EP.

Girls’ Generation started their official promotions on Music Bank, on June 26, 2009, ending their promotions on August 15.

History
The EP was released on June 29, 2009. Their first win for their single "Genie" was obtained at the July 10, 2009 episode of KBS Music Bank. Their second award was claimed at the July 12, 2009 episode of SBS Inkigayo. The group finished promotions for "Genie" in August 2009. The music video was released a little later and features the group members dancing in Navy uniforms.

Commercial performance
The album sold an estimated 50,000 copies in its first week after release (almost double the first-week sales of Gee), an unusual feat for any Korean girl group.

Single
In late June, SM Entertainment announced that Girls' Generation would be making a comeback with a new single and showing a "Marine Girl" concept; "Genie" was then released digitally on June 22, 2009. The group's first performance for the album was on June 26 on KBS Music Bank. The song topped single and ringtone charts.

Composition
This album contains a total of six songs including the lead single of the same title. The only single off the album, "Genie", is an electronica-style pop song influenced by the European dance genre, featuring a heavily synthesized intro.  The song was originally composed in English as "I Just Wanna Dance", after which it was retitled when Korean lyrics were composed by Yoo Young-jin. The lyrics' theme is exposed by the subtitle "Genie", which is the metaphorical symbol of "Goddesses of Luck". "Girlfriend" is a 1980s disco-style song while "Boyfriend" is a dance-pop song, bringing electro elements. "My Child" is with a piano-played intro in a gospel and classical style. "One Year Later" is a soft pop ballad duet sung by Jessica and Onew of Shinee. The duet was also featured in MBC TV drama Pasta.

Controversy
The physical release of Genie was delayed by SM Entertainment in order to redo the album art. Notable changes included removing the imagery of a World War II Imperial Japanese A6M Zero fighter and a slightly modified eagle insignia of the Nazi Party on the cover. As a result, the EP was officially released 4 days later on June 29, 2009.

Track listing

Awards

Release history

References

External links
 

2009 EPs
Girls' Generation albums
SM Entertainment EPs
Korean-language EPs